Cycas tansachana is a species of cycad in Thailand. They are located to the northeast of Khong Khi Sua in Kaeng Khoi District, Saraburi Province, central Thailand. It is also found in Praphotisat Cave Temple Huai Haeng (ห้วยแห้ง) Subdistrict, Kaeng Khoi District. It is locally abundant, but has a highly restricted distribution.

References

tansachana
Endemic flora of Thailand